Stimson may refer to:
 Charles Stimson (born 1963), American Pentagon official
 Frederic Jesup Stimson (1855–1943), American diplomat
 Gerry Stimson, British public health social scientist
 Henry L. Stimson (1867–1950), American statesman
 James Stimson (born 1943), American political scientist
 Mount Stimson, peak in Montana, named for Henry Stimson
 Hugh M. Stimson (1931–2011), American sinologist
 Julia Catherine Stimson (1881–1948), American nurse
 Mark Stimson (born 1967), English former footballer
 Miriam Michael Stimson (1913–2002), American nun and chemist
 Rufus W. Stimson (1868–1947), American agricultural educator and college president